Pierre D. Milman , born 1945 in Odessa, is a mathematician and a professor at the University of Toronto.

Milman graduated with a B.A. from the University of Moscow in 1967.  He obtained his Ph.D. from the University of Tel Aviv in 1975 after an interlude of several years as researcher at the Institute of Chemical Physics and then Solid State Physics in Moscow.

Awards
Pierre Milman won a two-year Connaught Transformative Research Grant in the 1996 competition within the Faculty of Arts and Science of the University of Toronto. In that year the grant was awarded also to the Nobel Prize laureate John Polani. Usually only one grant is awarded per year. In 1997, he was elected Fellow of the Royal Society of Canada.  He was awarded a Killam Research Fellowship in 2002, and the Jeffery–Williams Prize in 2005.

Family

Mathematics runs in the Milman family. His father is the mathematician David Milman, who co-authored the Krein–Milman theorem. His brother is the mathematician Vitali Milman.

External links

1945 births
Living people
Soviet mathematicians
20th-century Canadian mathematicians
Canadian people of Ukrainian-Jewish descent
Academic staff of the University of Toronto
Fellows of the Royal Society of Canada
20th-century Ukrainian mathematicians
Odesa Jews
Scientists from Odesa